Lithacodes is a genus of slug caterpillar moths in the family Limacodidae. There are about five described species in Lithacodes.

Species
These five species belong to the genus Lithacodes:
 Lithacodes fasciola (Herrich-Schäffer, 1854) c g b (yellow-shouldered slug moth)
 Lithacodes fiskeana Dyar, 1900 c g
 Lithacodes fiskeanus b (Fisk's slug moth)
 Lithacodes gracea Dyar, 1921 c g b (graceful slug moth)
 Lithacodes graefii Packard, 1887 c g
Data sources: i = ITIS, c = Catalogue of Life, g = GBIF, b = Bugguide.net

References

Further reading

External links

 

Limacodidae
Limacodidae genera
Taxa named by Alpheus Spring Packard